During the 1999–2000 English football season, Tranmere Rovers F.C. competed in the Football League First Division where they finished in 13th position on 57 points. Rovers had great success in the cup competitions reaching the final of the League Cup, losing 2–1 to Leicester, and also made the quarters in the FA Cup.

Final league table

Results
Tranmere's score comes first

Legend

Football League Division One

League Cup

FA Cup

Squad
Appearances for competitive matches only

References

Tranmere Rovers 1999–2000 at soccerbase.com (use drop down list to select relevant season)

See also
1999–2000 in English football

Tranmere Rovers F.C. seasons
Tranmere Rovers